Jan Hugger (born 10 July 1998) is a German racing cyclist, who currently rides for UCI Continental team .

Major results
2016
 10th Overall Ain'Ternational–Rhône Alpes–Valromey Tour
2020
 9th Overall International Tour of Rhodes
2021
 6th Overall International Tour of Rhodes

References

External links
 

1998 births
Living people
German male cyclists
People from Villingen-Schwenningen
Sportspeople from Freiburg (region)
Cyclists from Baden-Württemberg
21st-century German people